Xenotilapia nasus is a species of cichlid endemic to Lake Tanganyika.  This species can reach a length of  TL.

References

External links
 Photograph

nasus
Fish described in 1995
Taxonomy articles created by Polbot